Wurmannsquick is a municipality in the district of Rottal-Inn in Bavaria in Germany.

Wurmannsquick was first mentioned in 1220 and gained the right to hold a market ('Marktrecht') in 1312.

References

Rottal-Inn